Ethadophis epinepheli is an eel in the family Ophichthidae (worm/snake eels). It was described by Jacques Blache and Marie-Louise Bauchot in 1972. It is a tropical, marine eel which is known from a single specimen recovered from the stomach of a grouper in Senegal, in the eastern Atlantic Ocean. It is known to reach a total length of 42.4 centimetres.

References

Ophichthidae
Taxa named by Jacques Blache
Taxa named by Marie-Louise Bauchot
Fish described in 1972